The second USS General Greene was a frigate in the United States Navy during the Quasi-War with France.

Named after American Revolution General Nathaneal Greene, she was built under government contract by Benjamin Talman and James De Wolf at Warren, Rhode Island. Launched on 21 January 1799, the frigate was placed under command of Captain Christopher R. Perry. Perry's son, a young midshipman named Oliver Hazard Perry, was assigned to his father's ship.

Damage suffered in a heavy gale caused her to put in at Havana for repairs, and her crew was struck with yellow fever. More than 20 died and the frigate returned to Newport, Rhode Island, on 27 July with 37 men in various stages of recovery. After a thorough cleaning, fumigation, and change of ballast, she departed Newport on 23 September 1799 to take station at Cap Francois, San Domingo.

General Greene remained off San Domingo for the following six months. Much of her time was spent watching over the rebellion against General Toussaint in Haiti. She blockaded the port of Jacmel to cut off supplies of the rebels, and gave direct gunfire support to General Toussaint's army in the capture of Jacmel on 27 February 1800. She remained at Jacmel as a possible haven for American citizens until 27 April, when she sailed with two representatives sent by General Toussaint for an audience with the President of the United States, John Adams. Stopping at New Orleans, she embarked General James Wilkinson and his family for transport home. General Greene then proceeded as escort for 12 merchantmen bound to Havana. She finally returned to Newport,  arriving on 21 July 1800.

General Greene's crew was discharged and the frigate remained idle at Newport, until Captain Perry was retired under the Peace Establishment Act of 3 April 1801, after which she was laid up in ordinary at the Washington Navy Yard. She served as a floating sick bay for frigate  in 1803, and was reduced to a sheer hulk in 1805.

The General Greene was destroyed by flames on 24 August 1814 when British troops captured Washington, D.C. during the War of 1812.

References

Sailing frigates of the United States Navy
Quasi-War ships of the United States
1799 ships